Max Pine (April 30, 1866 – March 2, 1928) was a Russian-born Jewish-American labor activist.

Life 
Pine was born on April 30, 1866, in Lyubavichi, Mogilev Governorate, Russia. His father died when he was three, and when he was nine his mother sent him to apprentice as a printer in Velizh.

Pine mastered the trade and learned to typeset, but struggled to make a living and moved from place to place looking for work. In 1886, he moved to America. There wasn't a lot of Jewish printing done at that time, so he worked as a coal man for a few years. He then worked on children's kneepants, only to be fired after six weeks for joining a union. He was among the first to engage in organizing the trade, and his co-workers elected him as secretary of the union. His organization abilities spread to other trades and he was asked to help organize other unions. By the mid-1890s, he was a familiar figure in the young labor movement.

An early success for Pine came when the Knee Pants Makers' Union named him walking delegate. Three weeks later, the union's 1,000 members went on strike. He won several concessions from the strike for the union, including raising the wages from eight dollars a week to twelve and shortening work hours from thirteen or fourteen hours a day to ten.

In 1897, he was one of the founders of The Forward. He worked as a journalist for that paper, and was its editor at one point. He helped organize a tailors' strike that began on December 30, 1912, that involved 100,000 workers. He helped establish the Yidgezkom (Jewish Social Committee for the Relief of Victims of War, Pogroms, and Natural Disasters). He was on the national executive committee of the Workmen's Circle from 1922 to 1924 and served as secretary of the United Hebrew Trades. He helped establish the People's Relief Committee, which represented American Jewish labor in the American Jewish Joint Distribution Committee and its work to provide relief to Jews after World War I. In 1920, he and Judge Harry Fisher of Chicago went abroad to investigate conditions among Ukrainian Jews and to negotiate with authorities in Moscow about improving those conditions. The trip became the basis for the Joint's relief activities among Jews in the Soviet Union. When he returned home, he played an important role in propaganda for relief work and was credited with raising large amounts of funds.

In 1904, he was the Social Democratic candidate for the New York State Assembly in New York County's 12th District, losing the election to Democrat Edward Rosenstein. In 1908, he was the Socialist candidate for the Assembly in New York County's 4th District, losing the election to Democrat Aaron J. Levy. He also ran for Alderman on the Socialist ticket several times in the Lower East Side.

Pine died of pneumonia at his home in Maywood, New Jersey on March 2, 1928. More than 5,000 people attended the funeral at the Forward Building. Abraham Cahan Jacob Panken, Morris Feinstone, and Baruch Charney Vladeck spoke at his funeral. He was buried in the Workmen's Circle section of Mount Carmel Cemetery. He had a wife, three sons, and two daughter.

A trade school in Tel Aviv called the Max Pine Institute was named after him.

References 

1866 births
1928 deaths
People from Rudnyansky District, Smolensk Oblast
People from Orshansky Uyezd
Jews from the Russian Empire
American people of Russian-Jewish descent
Emigrants from the Russian Empire to the United States
Jewish American trade unionists
Jewish American activists
Jewish American journalists
Journalists from New York City
Editors of New York City newspapers
Yiddish-language journalists
New York (state) socialists
Social Democratic Party of America politicians
Socialist Party of America politicians from New York (state)
Politicians from Manhattan
20th-century American politicians
People from Maywood, New Jersey
Burials in New York (state)
Deaths from pneumonia in New Jersey